Heavy Harm is the third EP by Australian rock band Papa Vs Pretty. The album was recorded at Albert Studios in Sydney, Australia. It was produced by Australian musician and Something For Kate frontman Paul Dempsey in Sydney, and was mixed by Dempsey and Rick Will. The album was released by Peace & Riot in Australia on 13 August 2010, and was officially launched at a sold-out headline show at Sydney's Spectrum on 28 August.

A special pre-order package was made available for JB Hi-Fi customers online, including a signed copy of the EP and a limited edition poster. Album artwork was created by Melbourne design studio We Are Synapse. All tracks were written by Thomas Rawle.

Singles

The first single, title-track "Heavy Harm", was added to national rotation on Triple J radio in June 2010, and in July, an animated music video for the song by Melbourne design studio We Are Synapse was released , and added to rotation on Rage and Channel V.

Second single "Wrecking Ball" was added to Triple J national rotation in December 2010 and was named "Single of the Week" by iTunes Store Australia, on 22 December 2010. In late January 2011 an official music video for "Wrecking Ball", directed by Guy Verge Wallace and depicting life-size clay animation, was released .

Track listing

Personnel
Thomas Rawle - guitar, vocals, keyboards, songwriting
Angus Gardiner - bass, vocals, keyboards, violoncello
Tom Myers - drums, vocals

Additional personnel
Paul Dempsey - producer (all tracks), mixer (tracks 4 & 6)
Rick Will - mixer (tracks 1, 2, 3 & 5)
Reyne House - engineer
Michelle Barry - engineer
Anthony Laing - engineer
Simon Struthers - mastering
Dave May (for We Are Synapse) - art direction and design

References

External links
Papa Vs Pretty official website

Alternative rock EPs
Papa vs Pretty albums
2010 EPs
Indie pop EPs
EPs by Australian artists